The Shire of Yilgarn is a local government area in the eastern Wheatbelt region of Western Australia about  east of Perth, the state capital. The main industries within the Shire are mining and farming.

History

The Yilgarn Road District was established on 24 December 1891. The town of Southern Cross separated as the Municipality of Southern Cross on 16 June 1892, but was re-absorbed into the road district on 8 February 1918.

On 1 July 1961, it became a shire under the Local Government Act 1960, which reformed all remaining road districts into shires.

Wards
The Shire of Yilgarn has no wards.
The Shire of Yilgarn has 7 councillors.

Towns and localities
The towns and localities of the Shire of Yilgarn with population and size figures based on the most recent Australian census:

Former towns
 Noongar

Notable councillors
 William Oats, Southern Cross Municipality mayor 1895–1896; later a state MP
 Harold Seddon, Southern Cross Municipality councillor late 1910s; later a state MP
 Lionel Kelly, Yilgarn Road Board member 1929–1932, 1932–1943; later a state MP
 John Panizza, Shire of Yilgarn councillor 1975–1987, president 1982–1987; later a senator

Heritage-listed places

As of 2023, 116 places are heritage-listed in the Shire of Yilgarn, of which 15 are on the State Register of Heritage Places.

References

External links
 

 
Yilgarn